= Thomas Bassnett =

American meteorologist

Thomas Bassnett (born c. 1808) was an early American meteorologist. A listing of people interred at St. Nicholas Cemetery in Jacksonville, Florida shows a "BASSNETT, Thomas", b. Jun 9 1808 d. Feb 16 1886" that may be him.

== Works ==
- Outlines of a Mechanical Theory of Storms, Containing the True Law of Lunar Influence, with Practical Instructions to the Navigator, to Enable Him Approximately to Calculate the Coming Changes of the Wind and Weather, for Any Given Day, and for Any Part of the Ocean, D. Appleton & Co. (1854) Reprinted by Nabu Press (2011) ISBN 1-2719-7404-5
- Predictions of the Weather, Kirkwood & McGill, Printers (1854)
- Communication Regarding His Theory of Storms and General Physics, self-published? (1869)
- The True Theory of the Sun, Showing the Common Origin of the Solar Spots and Corona, and of Atmospheric Storms and Cyclones, G. P. Putnam's Sons (1884)
